John Winder may refer to:
 John R. Winder (1821–1910), English leader in The Church of Jesus Christ of Latter-day Saints
 John H. Winder (1800–1865), Confederate general in the American Civil War